For the online marketplace, see StockX.

Michel Stockx (1942 – 25 September 2001) was a Belgian serial killer who worked as a truck driver in Assen, Netherlands.

On 27 July 1991, he lured 11-year-old Jessica Laven from Blokker out of a swimming pool in Zwaag. Later she was found strangled in Bad Nieuweschans. During his interrogation, Stockx also confessed to abusing and murdering two German boys, 13-year-old Marco Weisser from Wiesbaden and 10-year-old Salim Thattil from Neustadt an der Weinstraße.

There are also persistent rumours that Stockx is responsible for the death of 10-year-old Belgian girl Nathalie Geijsbregts. Sjaak H., a member of the Venlo Gang, claimed that Stockx would have told him if that were true. He was also questioned as a suspect in the murder of Cheryl Morriën from IJmuiden but he denied any involvement.

In addition, his name is mentioned in connection to the murder of 10-year-old Anaïs Marcelli in Mulhouse in France.

For the murders of Laven, Weisser and Thattil, Michel Stockx was sentenced to 20 years in prison in November 1992 and he was detained in the Scheveningen Penitentiary. A few months before his death there was a stir in the Netherlands when it turned out that he received a disability benefit in prison.

On 18 September 2001, during his work therapy, he knocked over a bottle of turpentine and banged a fluorescent tube, causing a fire. More than 60% of his body was burned severely and he was transported to the burn center in Beverwijk. He died there on 25 September. The parents of Jessica Laven were pleased with the news. According to the police, it was an accident, but the media speculated it was an assassination attempt or suicide. However, the authorities refuted these claims.

See also 
 List of serial killers by country

References 

1942 births
2001 deaths
Belgian murderers of children
Belgian people convicted of murder
Belgian serial killers
Deaths from fire
Male serial killers
People from Lochristi
Serial killers who died in prison custody
Truck drivers